Neporadza  is a village and municipality in Trenčín District in the Trenčín Region of north-western Slovakia.

History
Historical records first mention the village in 1269.

Geography
It has a population of about 773 people.

External links
http://www.statistics.sk/mosmis/eng/run.html

Villages and municipalities in Trenčín District